José João da Silva (born 5 May 1954) is a Brazilian long-distance runner. He competed in the men's 5000 metres at the 1984 Summer Olympics.

References

1954 births
Living people
Athletes (track and field) at the 1984 Summer Olympics
Brazilian male long-distance runners
Olympic athletes of Brazil
Place of birth missing (living people)